The Ford Transit Supervans are a series of promotional vehicles built by Ford UK. They combine the outline and appearance of the popular Ford Transit van with the chassis and performance of a sports racing car.

Supervan 
The Supervan first appeared at the Easter 1971 meeting at Brands Hatch. The vehicle had been built for Ford by Terry Drury Racing. Externally the van appeared very like a standard Transit, in Ford's racing livery of white with low horizontal triple blue stripes. The wheel arches were flared to almost cover the wider wheels, but they were still noticeably exposed and different to those of a standard Transit. Aerodynamics of the high-mounted bodyshell were crude though, and although the van was usually demonstrated with drag starts, body lift limited its top speed on a track.

In 1978 the Transit was redesigned as the Mark 2, with quite different looks. Supervan's appearance now looked dated and no longer suitable for promoting the 'New' Transit.

Supervan 2 
In 1984 a new Supervan 2 was constructed. The bodyshell was a fibreglass replica of the Mark 2 Transit, although slightly lowered and fitted with a front airdam, large side air inlets and a high-mounted rear spoiler. The chassis was a Ford C100 Group C car, fitted with a Cosworth DFL engine. It was built by Auto Racing Technology of Wollaston Northants. Supervan 2's debut was at Donington Park for the first British truck racing Grand Prix.

Supervan 2'''s promotional lifespan was even shorter than the first Supervan. Just over a year later, the Mark 3 Transit was released, with a very different outline.

 Supervan 3 

In 1994, to promote the new Mark 3 Transit Facelift, Supervan 2 was rebuilt as Supervan 3''. This was the first time that Supervan had been used to promote a new model, rather than a model already nearing its end of life. A seven-eighths scale reduced replica of the new bodyshell was fitted, together with a new engine, a Cosworth HB. The work was carried out by DRL Engineering of Suffolk. This version also had the longest promotional lifespan, appearing in public until 2001. With several liveries in Ford's blue and white over the years, its final appearance was in Royal Mail red, celebrating Ford's new contract to supply their vans, taking over from a long arrangement with Leyland DAF Vans.

In 2004 a refurbishment was announced. The engine was replaced with a more practical Ford-Cosworth Pro Sports 3000 V6 engine, and the 1984 Ford Motorsport blue and white livery was restored. This work was carried out by Sporting and Historic Car Engineers of Bicester.

In 2007 it was suggested that Supervan 3's chassis might be rebuilt into a C100 and used for historic sports car racing.

SuperVan 4 Electric 

At the 2022 Goodwood Festival of Speed, the Ford Pro Electric SuperVan was introduced. The first all-electric Ford SuperVan (and the fourth so far) achieves the highest-performance of any Ford van ever, packing four electric motors, a 50kWh liquid-cooled battery and a bespoke control system to produce approximately 2,000 PS (1,972 horsepower). This enables it to sprint from zero to 62 mph (100 km/h) in under 2 seconds. The purpose-built chassis includes components from the recently unveiled electric Ford Transit Custom – the first fully electric version of the Ford Transit.

See also
 Renault Espace F1

References

Supervan
Vans
Ford racing cars